The King Cotton Stakes is an American Thoroughbred horse race held annually in February at Oaklawn Racing Casino Resort in Hot Springs, Arkansas. It is a Listed race and has also been held as a "Black Type" race. The race is typically six furlongs in length. The race was first ran in 1992.

Records 
Speed Record:

 1:04.08 – Kirby B (1996)

Most wins:

 2 – Beau's Town (2003, 2006)
 2 – Semaphorne Man (2007, 2008)
 2 – Native Ruler (2009, 2011)
 2 – Apprehender (2013, 2014)
 2 – Ivan Fallunovalot (2015, 2016)

Most wins by a jockey:

 6 – Calvin Borel (1997, 2000, 2006, 2010, 2015, 2016)

Most wins by a trainer:

 4 – Chris Richard (2009, 2011, 2013, 2014)

Most Wins by an owner:

 2 – Coast To Coast Racing Fund & David Hulkewicz (2003, 2006)
 2 – Double Bogey Racing (2007, 2008)
 2 – Maggi Ross (2008, 2011)
 2 – Dream Farm LLC (2013, 2014)
 2 – Lewis E. Mathews Jr. (2015, 2016)

Recent Winners

References

Arkansas
Horse racing in Arkansas
Flat horse races for four-year-olds
Open mile category horse races
Oaklawn Park